Sampson W. Keeble (May 18, 1833 –June 19, 1887 ) a businessman and politician in Tennessee during the Reconstruction era. In 1872, he was the first African American elected to the Tennessee Legislature, serving from 1873 to 1875 in the Tennessee House of Representatives as a Republican member from Davidson County.

Born into slavery in Rutherford County, Keeble became a barber. The profession enabled practitioners to build networks in the business community. At some time, Keeble moved to Nashville in Davidson County, Tennessee, where he built his business. After freedmen were granted the franchise, he joined the Republican Party and became politically active. In addition to serving in the legislature, he was a Davidson County magistrate, serving from 1877 to 1882.

A bronze bust of Keeble was dedicated in the Tennessee State Capitol in 2010.

See also
African-American officeholders during and following the Reconstruction era

References

Republican Party members of the Tennessee House of Representatives
African-American state legislators in Tennessee
1887 deaths
1833 births
Barbers
People from Rutherford County, Tennessee
Politicians from Nashville, Tennessee
19th-century American slaves
19th-century American politicians
African-American politicians during the Reconstruction Era
American freedmen